B class may refer to:

Ships 
 B-class corvette of the Turkish Navy
 B-class destroyer, launched in 1930 for the British Royal Navy
 B-class destroyer (1913), British torpedo boat destroyers
 B-class lifeboat, British lifeboats
 B-class submarine (disambiguation), several types

Rail transport 
 B-class Melbourne tram, an Australian tram
 DHR B Class, built for the Darjeeling Himalayan Railway in India
 NBR B class, a British steam locomotive
 NZR B class (1874), a steam locomotive of the New Zealand Railways Department
 NZR B class (1899), a steam locomotive of the New Zealand Railways Department
 CIE 101 Class, an Irish diesel locomotive
 CIE 113 Class, an Irish diesel locomotive
 LCDR B class, a British steam locomotive
 MRWA B class, a British steam locomotive
 Victorian Railways B class, an Australian steam locomotive
 Victorian Railways B class (diesel), an Australian diesel locomotive
 WAGR B class, an Australian steam locomotive
 WAGR B class (diesel), an Australian diesel locomotive

Other uses
 B-class blimp, airships operated by the United States Navy
 B-segment, a European vehicle size class
 Mercedes-Benz B-Class, a car

See also 
 Class B (disambiguation)
 B type (disambiguation)
 B series (disambiguation)